Sokołowice may refer to the following places in Poland:
Sokołowice, Lower Silesian Voivodeship (south-west Poland)
Sokołowice, Lesser Poland Voivodeship (south Poland)
Sokołowice, Greater Poland Voivodeship (west-central Poland)